In historical analysis, biblical criticism and comparative mythology/religion, parallelomania has been used to refer to a phenomenon (mania) where authors perceive apparent similarities and construct parallels and analogies without historical basis. The inverse phenomenon, which occurs when suggested similarities, for example between the Bible and Ancient Near East cultures, are dismissed out of hand, is called parallelophobia.

Parallelomania 
The concept was introduced to scholarly circles in 1961 by Rabbi Samuel Sandmel (1911–1979) of the Hebrew Union College in a paper of the same title, where he stated that he had first encountered the term in a French book of 1830, but did not recall the author or the title. Sandmel stated that the simple observations of similarity between historical events are often less than valid, but at times lead to a phenomenon where an author first notices a supposed similarity, overdoses on analogy, and then "proceeds to describe source and derivation as if implying a literary connection flowing in an inevitable or predetermined direction". Martin McNamara, MSC (Milltown Institute of Theology and Philosophy) stated that Sandmel's initial paper has proven to be "highly influential".

Christian and Jewish scholars have used the concept in a number of cases and areas. Thomas Schreiner (Southern Baptist Theological Seminary) applies it to over-generalization of the simple use of the verb "see" used as a participle to refer to a casual act of observation, to extending its meaning to have deeper spiritual contexts in order to construct parallels. Jewish scholar Jacob Neusner has stated that some portrayals of Aphrahat as someone who cherry picked from Rabbinical literature are based on weak parallels which fall within Sandmel's characterization of parallelomania. Joseph Fitzmyer, a priest of the Society of Jesus (SJ), states the analyses of the Pauline epistles have at times suffered from parallelomania through the construction of unwarranted analogies with prior traditions. Gerald O'Collins, SJ states that most scholars are now aware of the pitfalls of parallelomania which exaggerate the importance of trifling resemblances.

Parallelophobia 
The inverse phenomenon that at the slightest suggestion of similarity between the Bible and extra-biblical texts, one uncritically proclaims the uniqueness and independence of the Bible, is called 'parallelophobia'. In their 1986 comparison of KTU 1.23, line 14 with Exodus 23:19b, Exodus 34:26 and Deuteronomy 14:21, Robert Ratner and Bruce Zuckerman warned against both parallelomania and parallelophobia: 'Those who have made this connection without hesitation have indulged in the sort of "parallelomania" that can only distort the picture of Ugaritic religion and culture and its relevance to biblical studies. On the other hand, we should have a care not to overreact in the other direction. (...) Just as we should resist the temptations of "parallelomania," we should also not succumb to "parallelophobia" and thereby close ourselves off from a potential insight that the Bible (just conceivably) might throw upon this difficult Ugaritic text.'

Other scholars have also warned against both, such as Mark W. Chavalas (2003), who encouraged his colleagues to follow the example of William W. Hallo, who always noted both the differences and similarities between the Bible and other texts from the ancient Near East.

See also
 Apophenia
 Correspondence (theology)
 Hyperdiffusionism in archaeology
 Panbabylonism
 Pareidolia
 Typology (theology)

References

Biblical criticism
Comparative mythology
Comparative religion
Judaism and paganism
Christianity and paganism